Robert Niven (December 18, 1833 - December 21, 1921) was an American soldier who fought in the American Civil War. Niven received his country's highest award for bravery during combat, the Medal of Honor. Niven's medal was won for capturing two Confederate flags at the Battle of Waynesboro, Virginia, on March 2, 1865. He was honored with the award on March 26, 1865.

Niven was born in Harlem in New York and entered service in Rochester. He was later buried in Lakewood, Rhode Island.

Medal of Honor citation

See also
List of American Civil War Medal of Honor recipients: G–L

References

1833 births
1921 deaths
American Civil War recipients of the Medal of Honor
Burials in Rhode Island
People from Harlem
People of New York (state) in the American Civil War
Union Army officers
United States Army Medal of Honor recipients